Mount Blue may refer to:
 Mount Blue (Maine) in Maine, USA
 Mount Blue (New Hampshire) in New Hampshire, USA

See also
Blue Mountain (disambiguation)